Gongylomorphus is a genus of skinks found in Mauritius.

Species
There are three species:
Gongylomorphus bojerii  – Bojer's skink
Gongylomorphus borbonicus 
Gongylomorphus fontenayi

References

Gongylomorphus
Lizard genera
Taxa named by Leopold Fitzinger